Abbey Ling ( Burton; born 30 March 1987 in High Wycombe) is a British sports shooter from Nynehead, Somerset. She married fellow Team GB sports shooter Edward Ling in 2014, and has a daughter with him. She works as the head female coach at Ling Shooting School. She represented England at the 2018 Commonwealth Games. She is a five time world champion, World Cup, and commonwealth medalist.

Medals

 Total of 6 individual medals at the World and European championships: 2 Bronze, 4 Silver.
 Total of 5 team medals at World, European and Commonwealth Championships: 1 Bronze, 2 Silver, 2 Gold.
 Beat the World Record of 75ex75 plus 22 single barrel final (total 97ex100)
 4 times British Ladies champion - first woman to win three years in a row.

References

External links 
 
 
 
 
  (2010)

1987 births
Living people
British female sport shooters
English female sport shooters
Commonwealth Games medallists in shooting
Commonwealth Games silver medallists for England
Shooters at the 2010 Commonwealth Games
Shooters at the 2018 Commonwealth Games
European Games competitors for Great Britain
Shooters at the 2019 European Games
People from Taunton Deane (district)
21st-century British women
Medallists at the 2010 Commonwealth Games